Stephen Bray (born 23 August 1982) is a former Gaelic footballer who played for the Navan O'Mahony's club and the Meath county team. A two-footed corner forward, he is a prolific scorer. Bray had a very successful season with Meath in 2007, with a semi final appearance against Cork and an all star award. However, 2008 was what Bray himself described as a "disaster" for the team. Before joining the Meath senior team, he won Leinster Junior Football Championship and All-Ireland Junior Football Championship medals in 2003.

Honours
Leinster Senior Football Championship (1): 2010
Meath Senior Football Championship (4): 2008, 2012, 2014, 2015
All-Star (1): 2007
All-Ireland Junior Football Championship (1): 2003
Leinster Junior Football Championship (1): 2003
National Football League (1): Division 2 2007

References

External links
 GAAInfo Profile

1982 births
Living people
Meath inter-county Gaelic footballers
Navan O'Mahoneys Gaelic footballers